The Arapaho Independent School District, also known as Arapaho-Butler Public Schools, is a school district based in Arapaho, Oklahoma, United States. It contains an elementary school and a combined middle/high school.

See also
List of school districts in Oklahoma

References

External links
 
 Arapaho overview at GreatSchools.net

School districts in Oklahoma
Education in Custer County, Oklahoma
School districts established in 1892
1892 establishments in Oklahoma Territory